The 1939–40 Duke Blue Devils men's basketball team represented Duke University during the 1939–40 men's college basketball season. The head coach was Eddie Cameron, coaching his 12th season with the Blue Devils. The team finished with an overall record of 19–7.

References 

Duke Blue Devils men's basketball seasons
Duke
1939 in sports in North Carolina
1940 in sports in North Carolina